Eressa vespina is a moth of the family Erebidae. It was described by Walter Rothschild in 1912. It is found on Borneo.

References

Eressa
Moths described in 1912